The 1995 US Open was a tennis tournament played on outdoor hard courts at the USTA National Tennis Center in New York City in New York in the United States. It was the 115th edition of the US Open and was held from August 28 to September 10, 1995.

Seniors

Men's singles

 Pete Sampras defeated  Andre Agassi 6–4, 6–3, 4–6, 7–5
 It was Sampras' 7th career Grand Slam title and his 3rd US Open title.

Women's singles

 Steffi Graf defeated  Monica Seles 7–6(8–6), 0–6, 6–3
 It was Graf's 18th career Grand Slam title and her 4th US Open title.

Men's doubles

 Todd Woodbridge /  Mark Woodforde defeated  Alex O'Brien /  Sandon Stolle 6–3, 6–3
 It was Woodbridge's 10th career Grand Slam title and his 1st US Open title. It was Woodforde's 10th career Grand Slam title and his 1st US Open title.

Women's doubles

 Gigi Fernández /  Natasha Zvereva defeated  Brenda Schultz-McCarthy /  Rennae Stubbs 7–5, 6–3
 It was Fernández's 14th career Grand Slam title and her 4th US Open title. It was Zvereva's 16th career Grand Slam title and her 3rd US Open title.

Mixed doubles

 Meredith McGrath /  Matt Lucena defeated  Gigi Fernández /  Cyril Suk 6–4, 6–4
 It was McGrath's only career Grand Slam title. It was Lucena's only career Grand Slam title.

Juniors

Boys' singles

 Nicolas Kiefer defeated  Ulrich Jasper Seetzen 6–3, 6–4

Girls' singles

 Tara Snyder defeated  Annabel Ellwood 6–4, 4–6, 6–2

Boys' doubles

 Jong-Min Lee /  Jocelyn Robichaud defeated  Raemon Sluiter /  Peter Wessels 7–6, 6–2

Girls' doubles

 Corina Morariu /  Ludmila Varmužová defeated  Anna Kournikova /  Aleksandra Olsza 6–3, 6–3

External links
 Official US Open website

 
 

 
US Open
US Open (tennis) by year
US Open
US Open
US Open
US Open